This is a list of major political scandals in Slovakia (since 1 January, 1993):

See also
 Politics of Slovakia
 Crime in Slovakia

References

  
Slovakia
Scandals